The 2011–12 Houston Baptist Huskies men's basketball team represented Houston Baptist University in the 2011–12 college basketball season. This was head coach Ron Cottrell's twenty-first season at HBU. The Huskies played their home games at the Sharp Gymnasium and are members of the Great West Conference. They finished the season 10–20, 3–7 in Great West play to finish in fifth place. They lost in the quarterfinal of the Great West Basketball tournament to NJIT.

Roster

Schedule and results
Source

|-
!colspan=12 style=| Exhibition

|-
!colspan=12 style=|Regular Season

|-
!colspan=9 style=| Great West tournament

References

Houston Christian Huskies men's basketball seasons
Houston Baptist
Hou
Hou